Grovesend railway station served the village of Grovesend, in the historical county of Glamorganshire, Wales, from 1910 to 1932 on the Llanelly Railway.

History 
The station was opened on 1 January 1910 by the London and North Western Railway. It closed on 6 June 1932.

References 

Disused railway stations in Swansea
Former London and North Western Railway stations
Railway stations in Great Britain opened in 1910
Railway stations in Great Britain closed in 1932
1910 establishments in Wales
1932 disestablishments in Wales